The Andrews Cargo Module was a proposed design for an unmanned resupply spacecraft which would deliver cargo to the International Space Station (ISS). Andrews Space proposed to NASA that spacecraft of this design be used for the Commercial Orbital Transportation Services (COTS) program.  The proposal was ultimately rejected in favor of the SpaceX Dragon and the Orbital Sciences Cygnus.

Design 
The spacecraft consists of a common Service Module, a Pressurized Cargo Module (PCM) or an Unpressurized Cargo Module (UCM), and a Recovery Module.

Associated launch vehicle 
The spacecraft was to be launched on the proposed Hercules launch vehicle.

References

External links
 Andrews Space

Cargo spacecraft